Alfredo Pérez (born 11 March 1972) is a Venezuelan fencer who competed in the individual and team foil events at the 1996 Summer Olympics.

References

External links
 

1972 births
Living people
Venezuelan male foil fencers
Olympic fencers of Venezuela
Fencers at the 1996 Summer Olympics